The Vz. 50 (also known as the CZ 50) is a Czechoslovakian made double-action, semi-automatic pistol. Vz is an abbreviation of the Czech (as well as Slovak) term "vzor" meaning model.

History

Design
After the Second World War, Czechoslovakia's Ministry of the Interior requested a new pistol design from Česká zbrojovka Uherský Brod. The resulting gun was chambered in .32 ACP and designed by two brothers Jan and Jaroslav Kratochvíl. It combined elements from both the Walther PP and PPK. The pistol is fed from an 8-round single-stack magazine, located within the bakelite paneled grip. Small fixed sights are located on top of the slide. The pistol functions via the blowback principle - gas pressure from burning powder simultaneously forces the cartridge case and slide backward and forces the bullet forward in the barrel. After it reaches the end of its rearward travel, the recoil spring returns the slide to its forward position, stripping and chambering a new round from the magazine as it does so, rendering the gun ready to fire again. Hammer and trigger operation is single and double action  .

Manufacture
Vz. 50s were sold commercially but most were distributed to police agencies under control of the Ministry of the Interior. They were produced initially at Strakonice and later at Uherský Brod. Manufacture ended in 1970 with the refinement of the pistol in a new model known as the Vz. 70.

Markings

Serial numbers
Serial numbers start at 650001, continuing from the discontinued vz. 27 serial number range. Pistols manufactured at the Strakonice factory fall in the 740000 range. Pistols manufactured at Uhersky Brod have 5 digit serial numbers preceded by a letter (which may change in the middle of a number series).

Date stamp
On the Vz.70, the last two digits of the year of manufacture are stamped on the left rear of the slide next to the proof stamp (a lion superimposed on an "N").

Government property stamp
Vz 50s bearing a stamp of crossed swords indicates they were government property.

Variants

In 1970, an update of the Vz. 50 was released with minor cosmetic changes and internal improvements  called the Vz. 70 (also known as CZ 70). These changes included:
 New grip shape with a larger recess (Called the "tang") for the web between thumb and finger.
 Milling on the trigger guard was changed to a more blended merge with the frame, removing sharp angles.
 New grip pattern using a grid of dimples instead of grooves.
 Top of the slide is engraved with a fine wave pattern to reduce glare.
 Serial number is stamped on the slide under the ejection port instead of below and behind it.
 Slide serrations are wider and there are more of them.
 Take down lever has a cross hatched instead of grooved surface.
 Larger hammer with a hole in it.
 Smaller magazine release.
 Magazines have new base with a more angular and less curved shape
 Grip extension via a modified floor-plate on the magazine (for the pinky finger).

See also 
 Česká zbrojovka firearms
 Česká zbrojovka Uherský Brod firearms manufacturer
 Police of the Czech Republic

References

External links
 World Guns, Modern Firearms, Handguns" Cz-50 / vz.50 and Cz-70 / vz.70 pistols (Czechoslovakia)
 The Original CZ Forum
 CZ Forum
 CZ - Handgun Forum
 CZ Firearm Forum
 Ebook: CZ-70 pistol explained

Semi-automatic pistols of Czechoslovakia
.32 ACP semi-automatic pistols
Firearms articles needing attention